He Knew He Was Right is a 2004 BBC TV adaptation of the Anthony Trollope novel He Knew He Was Right. It was directed by Tom Vaughan from a screenplay by Andrew Davies, produced by Nigel Stafford-Clark and starred Oliver Dimsdale, Laura Fraser, and Bill Nighy. It was originally broadcast on the BBC in four hourly episodes.

Plot summary
The series portrays the failure of a marriage caused by the unreasonable jealousy of a husband exacerbated by the stubbornness of a wilful wife.

Cast
Oliver Dimsdale — Louis Trevelyan
Laura Fraser — Emily Trevelyan
Anna Massey — Miss Stanbury
Bill Nighy — Colonel Osborne
Geoffrey Palmer — Sir Marmaduke Rowley
Christina Cole — Nora Rowley
Geraldine James — Lady Rowley
Jane Lapotaire — Lady Milborough
Raymond Coulthard — Mr. Glascock
Maggie Ollerenshaw — Martha
Stephen Campbell Moore — Hugh Stanbury
Caroline Martin — Dorothy Stanbury
Amy Marston — Priscilla Stanbury
Joanna David — Mrs. Stanbury
Barbara Flynn — Mrs. French
Anna-Louise Plowman — Caroline Spalding
David Tennant — Mr Gibson
John Alderton — Mr Outhouse
Fenella Woolgar — Arabella French
Claudie Blakley — Camilla French
Matthew Goode — Brooke Burgess
Ron Cook- Mr. Bozzle
Patsy Palmer - Mrs. Bozzle
Sinead Matthews — Mary

References

External links
 He Knew He Was Right BBC programme page.
 

2004 British television series debuts
Television shows written by Andrew Davies
2004 British television series endings
2000s British drama television series